In mathematical analysis, the initial value theorem is a theorem used to relate frequency domain expressions to the time domain behavior as time approaches zero.

Let

 

be the (one-sided) Laplace transform of ƒ(t).

Proofs

Proof using dominated convergence theorem and assuming that function is bounded 
Suppose first that  is bounded, i.e. . A change of variable in the integral
 shows that 
.
Since  is bounded, the Dominated Convergence Theorem implies that

Proof using elementary calculus and assuming that function is bounded 
Of course we don't really need DCT here, one can give a very simple proof using only elementary calculus:

Start by choosing  so that , and then

Generalizing to non-bounded functions that have exponential order 
The theorem assuming just that  follows from the theorem for bounded :

Define . Then  is bounded, so we've shown that .

since .

See also
 Final value theorem

Notes

Theorems in analysis